W is the fifth studio album by Italian Eurodance project Whigfield which was performed by Danish-born Sannie Charlotte Carlson, released on 28 September 2012 by Italian label Off Limits. It is her first studio album in 10 years since her previous studio album 4 back in 2002.

Track listing

Credits and personnel
Larry Pignagnoli – producer, vocal producer
Luigi Barone – arrangement, performer, mixer, mastering
Sannie Carlson – vocal arrangement

Credits adapted from album liner notes.

References

External links
 

Whigfield albums
2012 albums